Talebabad (also Romanized as Ţālebābād) is a village in Fathabad Rural District, in the Central District of Khatam County, Yazd Province, Iran. At the 2006 census, its population was 51, in 9 families.

References 

Populated places in Khatam County